Deltadectes is an extinct genus of early rhynchocephalian from the Late Triassic of Switzerland. It contains a single species, Deltadectes elvetica.

References 

Sphenodontia
Prehistoric reptile genera